Jorge Alberto Martinez (born March 31, 1977), known as Jorge Alberti, is a Puerto Rican actor who has starred in many telenovelas, most recently in Hombre Tenías que Ser.

Acting career
Jorge Alberti portrayed the role of Roberto on the former NBC daytime drama Passions for three years and had a small role in Steven Soderbergh's Che starring Benicio del Toro. From 2007 to 2008 he starred in Lola, the number one prime time television series in Chile on Canal 13.

In 2007, Jorge Alberti signed on with Hollywood Talent Manager Ruben Malaret of Malaret Entertainment for exclusive representation worldwide and obtained a protagonist role in the Mexican telenovela, Vuélveme A Querer, in 2009.

In February 2008 Alberti was honored at the world-famous "Viña Del Mar Festival" he was crowned as the "Rey" (King) of the festival by the International Press whom attends the Festival every year.

In 2011, he returned to Mexico to participate in Emperatriz. A year after Emperatriz ended, he portrayed a villain in La Otra Cara del Alma.

From late 2013 to early 2014 he portrayed Franco Santoyo on the Azteca produced telenovela Hombre Tenías que Ser.

Personal life
Alberti married Karla Parrilla in December 2008. In 2010, Parrilla gave birth to the couple's first child, a daughter named Isabella.

Filmography

See also

List of Puerto Ricans

References

External links

Official site

Living people
People from Mayagüez, Puerto Rico
Puerto Rican male telenovela actors
Puerto Rican expatriates in Chile
Expatriate actors in Chile
American male soap opera actors
American male television actors
1977 births